Volumnia Cytheris (fl. 1st-century BC) was an ancient Roman actress and mimae dancer. She is foremost known as the mistress of several famous Romans. 

She was originally a slave and later freedwoman. On stage, she was normally referred to only as Cytheris. The name derived from "Cythera" a nickname for Aphrodite. She had relationships with Brutus and Mark Antony, which attracted a lot of attention in contemporary ancient Rome.  She is mentioned as the companion of her aristocratic lovers in social occasions when the presence of a courtesan was otherwise not common, and considered shocking.

Her rejection of Cornelius Gallus reportedly provided the theme for Virgil's tenth Eclogue. Gallus refers to her in his work under the name Lycoris.

She is one of few free influential Roman courtesans mentioned by her contemporaries, others being Praecia and Chelidon.

See also
 Tertia (actress)

References 

 Matthew Dillon, Lynda Garland,  Ancient Rome: A Sourcebook
 Edith Hall, Rosie Wyles,  New Directions in Ancient Pantomime

Ancient actresses
Ancient Roman courtesans
1st-century BC Roman women
1st-century BC Romans
Ancient Roman theatre practitioners
Mistresses
Ancient Roman dancers
Republican era slaves and freedmen
Mark Antony
Marcus Junius Brutus